Sunset Beach is an unincorporated community in Monongalia County, West Virginia, United States.

Sunset Beach is located upon the Cheat Lake.

References 

Unincorporated communities in West Virginia
Unincorporated communities in Monongalia County, West Virginia